Fateh Jang railway station is  located in Fateh Jang, Attock district, Pakistan.

History
Fateh Jang railway station was built by North Western Railways in 1881.

Services
The station is a stoppage of two trains:
 Kohat Express
 Mehr Express

See also
 List of railway stations in Pakistan
 Pakistan Railways

References

External links

Railway stations in Attock District
Railway stations on Khushalgarh–Kohat–Thal Railway